Anthony Cosmo Callea (born 13 December 1982) is an Australian singer-songwriter and stage actor who rose to prominence as the runner-up in the 2004 season of Australian Idol. Callea's debut single, a cover of Celine Dion and Andrea Bocelli's song "The Prayer", is the fastest-selling single by an Australian artist; it held the number-one spot on the ARIA Singles Chart for five weeks, a record for the debut single of an Australian Idol contestant, and was the second-highest-selling Australian single of the 2000s (decade)

Callea has accumulated a string of awards, including an ARIA Music Award, Channel V Artist of the Year, Pop Republic Artist of the Year, MTV Viewers' Choice Award, Variety's Young Entertainer of the Year, an MO Award, and a Gospel Music Award. He is known for his powerful trained voice and his versatility in a range of genres in releases and live performances. All but one of the tracks on his second album A New Chapter were co-written by him. October 2011 saw Callea release his first new music in four years, a single titled "Oh Oh Oh Oh Oh", self-funded, released and distributed as a fully independent venture through his own production company, Vox Enterprises. The dance-pop track was co-written in LA with two-time Grammy-nominated and official DJ for the Black Eyed Peas, Poet Name Life. It signalled a departure from the ballads for which he is known and was released in digital format only.

His albums, DVDs, and singles have all debuted in the top 20 of the ARIA Charts with the exception of "Oh Oh Oh Oh" and an EP titled Last To Go, released in February 2012, and his fourth album released in 2013. However, "Oh Oh Oh Oh" debuted at number 6 on the Official Independent Music Charts AIR Charts, and in its first week, peaked at number 17 on the ARIA Top 20 Australian Artists Singles Chart. Last To Go reached number 7 on the Independent Distribution Singles Chart.

In March 2013, it was announced Callea signed a record deal with ABC Music and would release his third studio album on 26 April 2013. The new release, entitled Thirty, was the first of two albums released that year, and were distributed by Universal Music. The second, released on 8 November 2013 was a Christmas album titled This Is Christmas. In August 2014 Callea released his third album with ABC music but, in contrast to previous albums, this was a Live DVD/CD Ladies & Gentlemen: The Songs of George Michael filmed and recorded at the Palms at Crown Melbourne. The DVD debuted at number 1 on the Australian ARIA Charts. On 5 August 2016, after three albums with ABC Music, Callea announced that he had re-signed with Sony Music Australia and would be releasing his sixth album Backbone along with an East Coast tour, due to be released in September 2016.

Early life
Callea began entering talent contests as a child and trained with the Johnny Young Young Talent Time Talent School.

Music career

2004: Australian Idol
He was selected for the final 30 in the television series Australian Idol in 2004. Based on viewer votes, he did not make it through the first round of competition, but was invited back as a "Judge's Choice Wildcard", where his performance earned him a place in the final 12. The competition concluded in November 2004 with Callea finishing as runner-up to Casey Donovan. 

Callea was immediately signed to Sony/BMG Records, and his first single, "The Prayer" was released in December 2004. It debuted on the ARIA Singles Chart at number one, and remained there for five consecutive weeks. Within seven weeks, it was certified four times platinum, selling in excess of 280,000 copies. In 2010 ARIA named it as the second-highest selling single of the last decade, which also made it the second-highest selling Australian artist song of that decade. His next single, the double A-side "Rain"/"Bridge over Troubled Water" spent two weeks at number one. His self-titled album debuted at number one in the week of 4 April 2005, and remained at the top of the chart for three weeks. His third single "Hurts So Bad" debuted at number ten on the ARIA Charts, while the album's final single, "Per Sempre (for Always)" debuted at number five.

2005–present: Continued success
In July 2005, Callea made an east coast of Australia tour adding dates along the way in 2005. Supporting Callea on tour was Tina Cousins. Callea's DVD Live in Concert was released on 7 November 2005. It debuted at No. 3 in the ARIA DVD Chart and was awarded platinum status.

Callea released the single "Live for Love" on 26 May from his second album A New Chapter, the only song on the album which he did not co-write. Both the single and the album, released on 25 November 2006, debuted at number 9. The album contains a mix of genres characteristic to Callea, including power ballads and more up-tempo songs.
Callea also contributed his version of the Brian McKnight song, "Home", to the compilation album Home: Songs of Hope & Journey, which was released to raise funds for BeyondBlue, an anti-depression organisation. 
The second single "Addicted to You" debuted at no. 19 when released in February 2007.

From July to September 2007, Callea embarked on his A New Chapter tour with his four-piece band. Callea performed the songs in his album A New Chapter as well as some of his classic songs, playing 18 shows across the country.

In 2011, Callea headlined the 2011 Stockholm PrideFestival.

Callea's third release was released independently. Callea released the lead single "Oh Oh Oh Oh" to his upcoming EP in 2011. It reached No.17 on the Australian Artist Singles Chart. A 2012 EP titled Last To Go peaked at No. 7 on the Independent Distribution Music Chart.

His third studio album Thirty in 2013 is a collection of inspirational songs embracing the artists and music that had influenced him, with some original tracks.

Callea released a 2013 Christmas album, This Is Christmas with duets with the National Boys Choir and husband/actor Tim Campbell.

On 16 May 2014 Callea performed a one-off concert titled Ladies and Gentlemen – The songs of George Michael. This concert was recorded and will be released as a 17-track CD/DVD on 1 August 2014. In June, Callea announced an extension of his "Ladies & Gentlemen: The Songs of George Michael" concert, with dates in September and October through Perth, Adelaide, Brisbane, Sydney and Melbourne.

Callea released Backbone in 2016, which debuted at number 1 on the ARIA Charts.

In September 2017, Callea released ARIA Number 1 Hits in Symphony which also debuted at number 1 on the ARIA Charts.

In October 2019, Called released the stand-along single "What's Wrong with Me?". This was followed in 2020 with "Lonely" and "Shadows".

On 30 September 2022, Called released "Heaven" and announced the forthcoming release of studio album, Forty Love, scheduled for release on 21 October 2022.

Notable performances
 In 2005, performed with Luciano Pavarotti on his last trip to Australia.
 In March 2006, performed for Queen Elizabeth II at Commonwealth Day Church Service in Sydney.
 In 2006, Callea was the support act for the Australian leg of Diana Ross's I Love You 2006 tour.
 In 2007, Callea was the support act for Westlife's Arena Tour.
 In 2008, Callea was the support act for Celine Dion's Taking Chances world tour.
 In February 2009 joined Tina Arena to perform an impromptu performance of "The Prayer" at Melbourne's Grand Hyatt re-launch
 In 2010, was a special guest of the Australian leg of Whitney Houston's Nothing but Love World Tour.
 In January 2011, performed a one-off special concert for the Australian Flood Victims at Rally For Relief at Rod Laver Arena, Melbourne.
 In 2013, supported Mariah Carey on her first Australian shows in 14 years.
 In 2013, performed "Go the Distance" at The Special Olympics 2013 Asia Pacific Opening Ceremony.

Television work

It Takes Two season 2
In 2007, Callea was one of the professional voices on a Seven Network's weekly musical competition program, It Takes Two, in which celebrities from non-musical fields were teamed with professional singers to perform a duet each week. Callea was paired with radio DJ Jo Stanley and finished in second place, competing against Jolene Anderson and David Campbell at the finals.

Performances

 Week One: The Veronicas – "4ever" (Pop)
 Week Two: Chaka Khan – "I Say a Little Prayer" (Songs from the Movies)
 Week Three: Kelly Clarkson – "Because of You" (Ballad)
 Week Four: Blondie – "Call Me" (No. 1 Hits)
 Week Five: Peaches & Herb – "Shake Your Groove Thing" (Disco)
 Week Six: ABBA – "SOS" (70s & 80s)
 Week Seven: Diana Ross – "You Are Everything" (Motown)
 Week Eight: Judy Garland – "Get Happy" (Swing) & Joan Jett – "I Love Rock 'n' Roll" (Rock)
 Week Nine: Anthony Callea – "The Prayer" (A song their mentor was famous for) & Chuck Berry – "Johnny B. Goode" (Rock & Roll)
 Week Ten (Finale): Encore performances of Kelly Clarkson's "Because of You", Judy Garland's "Get Happy", and a new performance of Irene Cara's "Flashdance... What a Feeling"

It Takes Two season 3

In 2008, Callea again performed as one of the professional voices on the Seven Network's weekly musical competition program, It Takes Two, in which celebrities from non-musical fields are teamed with professional singers to perform a duet each week. Callea's partner for season three was ironwoman Candice Falzon. Callea and Falzon were eliminated in week seven, finishing in fifth place.

Ultimate School Musical: Fame
Callea joined the cast of Foxtel's Ultimate School Musical: Fame documentary in 2010 filming the series alongside Ruby Rose and others in Melbourne. The show features school children attempting to put on a professional musical in just six weeks. Callea is the series' voice coach.

After nationwide auditions the students of Essendon Keilor College in Melbourne were cast in the 10-part series to premiere exclusively on FOX8 under the guidance of director Eddie Perfect, theatre producer John Frost, choreographer Kelley Abbey and singer Callea.

I'm a Celebrity...Get Me Out of Here! Series 2

On 31 January 2016, Callea was revealed as a contestant on season 2 of I'm a Celebrity...Get Me Out of Here! Australia.
Callea placed fourth in the series behind the ultimate winner Brendan Fevola. He also described his time in the jungle as one of the best experiences of his life and hoped that it bought more awareness to his chosen charity Lifeline (crisis support service).

The Celebrity Apprentice Australia

In October 2020, Callea was announced as a competing celebrity contestant on the fifth season of The Celebrity Apprentice Australia in 2021. Callea went on the show supporting the Children's Cancer Foundation, and raised $20k for them before he was "fired" in task 4.

Theatre/Musicals

In September 2007, in his first musical production, Callea played a supporting role in Dead Man Walking, the true story of Sister Helen Prejean, an unconventional nun, who accompanies murderer Joe de Rocher to his death by execution. It explores the opposing desires for vengeance and forgiveness in this extreme situation, and the commitment required to love or to hate a fellow human being.

In November 2007, Callea played the lead role Mark Cohen, a filmmaker and video artist, and Roger's roommate, in the Perth production of American Tony Award and Pulitzer Prize-winning rock musical Rent. This was Callea's second musical production. He starred alongside his now-partner, Tim Campbell. Callea took the role of Boq in the Australian premiere of the Broadway musical Wicked, in Melbourne 2008–2009 and in 2013 he was cast as Rydell High's rock star student Johnny Casino in the Australian production of Grease (musical) alongside Rob Mills as Danny, and Gretel Scarlett as Sandy. Bert Newton, Todd McKenney, Lucy Maunder and Stephen Mahy also starred.

Personal life
On 27 March 2007, after speculation and tabloid rumours dating back to his Idol appearances, Callea publicly acknowledged that he is gay by issuing a statement confirming his sexuality and thanking his fans and his then-partner, Paul Riggio, who worked as a talent coordinator on Australian Idol during Anthony's run on the show.

"Yes, I am gay," Callea said. "I have no issue with my sexuality now, but it's taken time to become confident with who I am and happy with who I am. I'm comfortable enough to come clean now. It's a weight off my shoulders".

On 30 March 2007, Michael Kirby, then a judge of the High Court of Australia, described Callea as an "admirable Australian" for coming out. Justice Kirby added, "In terms of influencing popular culture and understanding of the reality of human sexual diversity, I would trade ten judges for one popular singer."

Callea has also admitted to suffering from depression in his teenage years, saying, "I went through major depression. I hated myself. I had to see a psychologist. I wasn't talking to anybody. My parents didn't know what was wrong with me." Callea has since supported beyondblue, an Australian initiative against depression, by contributing his version of a Brian McKnight song, "Home", to a compilation album, Home: Songs of Hope & Journey, by various Australian artists to raise funds and bring attention to the organisation and its cause.

In February 2008, he and actor/singer Tim Campbell confirmed that they were in a relationship after they broke up with their respective partners to be together. On 18 August 2014, Campbell and Callea announced their engagement. They were married in New Zealand in November 2014.

Callea was part of the Tsunami Relief Telethon and was invited to perform at the Red Cross Ball in the presence of Prince Frederik and Princess Mary of Denmark. He has worked with The Starlight Foundation, the Royal Children's Hospital, The Mirabel Foundation, and The Salvation Army. Callea was the ambassador for the 2007 Perth Telethon for the Royal Children's Hospital and in 2007 was appointed official ambassador for Vision Australia. For the second time he was official ambassador for 2009's Vision Australia's Carols By Candlelight. 2022 marked the 19th year in a row Callea performed at this event.

Discography

 Anthony Callea (2005)
 A New Chapter (2006)
 Thirty (2013)
 This Is Christmas (2013)
 Backbone (2016)
 ARIA Number 1 Hits in Symphony (2017)
 Forty Love (2022)

Awards and nominations

ARIA Music Awards
The ARIA Music Awards is an annual awards ceremony that recognises excellence, innovation, and achievement across all genres of Australian music. It commenced in 1987.

|-
| rowspan="3"|ARIA Awards 2005
| Anthony Callea
| ARIA Award for Highest Selling Album
| 
|-
| "The Prayer"
| rowspan="2"| ARIA Award for Highest Selling Single
| 
|-
| "Rain" / "Bridge Over Troubled Water"
| 
|-

Channel V Oz Artist of the Year
The Channel V Oz Artist of the Year was an annual award presented by Channel V Australia and is voted by the Australian public. It ran from 1997 to 2015.

|-
| 2005
| Anthony Callea
| Channel V Oz Artist of the Year
| 
|-

Mo Awards
The Australian Entertainment Mo Awards (commonly known informally as the Mo Awards), were annual Australian entertainment industry awards. They recognise achievements in live entertainment in Australia from 1975 to 2016.
 (wins only)
|-
| 2004
| Anthony Callea
| Contemporary Rock Performer of the Year
| 
|-

References

External links

 
 Representation
 Anthony Callea's official YouTube channel
 
 Harbour Agency
 Sony Bandit.fm Breathe profile
 Daily News

1982 births
ARIA Award winners
Australian Idol participants
Australian male singer-songwriters
Place of birth missing (living people)
Australian pop singers
Australian gay musicians
Australian LGBT singers
Australian LGBT songwriters
Gay songwriters
Singers from Melbourne
Sony BMG artists
Gay singers
Living people
21st-century Australian male singers
I'm a Celebrity...Get Me Out of Here! (Australian TV series) participants
The Apprentice Australia candidates
20th-century Australian LGBT people
21st-century Australian LGBT people